Zalewo  is a town in Iława County, Warmian-Masurian Voivodeship, Poland, with 2,977 inhabitants (2008).

History
The settlement was founded in the 13th century and was granted town rights in 1305.

During the Napoleonic Wars in 1807 Polish soldiers of General Jan Henryk Dąbrowski were quartered in the town.

During World War II it was destroyed in 70%.

Sports
The local football club is Ewingi Zalewo. It competes in the lower leagues.

Gallery

International relations

Twin towns — Sister cities

 Rūdiškės, Lithuania 
 Saalfeld/Saale, Germany

Notable people 

Hans-Joachim Kappis (1908–1970), Wehrmacht officer
Herbert Kelletat (1907–2007), musician, author, choir director
Hans-Joachim Kroschinski (1920–1995), German flying ace
Ernst Kutschkau (1910–1947) Wehrmacht soldier
Grażyna Prokopek (born 1977), athlete
Robert Roberthin (1600–1648), one of the first regional poets

References

External links 

Cities and towns in Warmian-Masurian Voivodeship
Iława County

it:Zalewo